A Certain Young Man is a 1928 comedy film directed by Hobart Henley. The film stars Ramon Novarro, Marceline Day, Renée Adorée, Carmel Myers and Bert Roach. The film is considered lost. A trailer for the film is preserved at the Library of Congress.

Synopsis
An English lord is overly fond of married women.

Cast
 Ramon Novarro as Lord Gerald Brinsley
 Marceline Day as Phyllis
 Renée Adorée as Henriette
 Carmel Myers as Mrs. Crutchley
 Bert Roach as Mr. Crutchley
 Huntley Gordon as Mr. Hammond
 Ernest Wood as Hubert

Production
The film was shot in 1926, but was not released until 1928. Sally O'Neil was originally cast as Phyllis but was replaced by Marceline Day.

Joan Crawford, still an ingenue at the time, was considered for that same role, but she was deemed "unsuitable". Castmember Willard Louis died a few months after filming wrapped, and his name was removed from the credits.

Release
A Certain Young Man opened to reviews that were lukewarm at best, and was a financial failure at the box office. Some screenings were preceded by the Technicolor short The Czarina's Secret featuring Sally Rand and Olga Baclanova. The film's release followed on the heels of A Gentleman of Paris with Adolph Menjou, which was based on the same source material and was considered a better adaptation. Novarro's performance was unfavorably compared with that of Menjou by several critics, including Mordaunt Hall of the New York Times, who found the overall film "only mildly amusing and very shallow," though he found Myers "charming" and work by supporting actors Huntley Gordon and Bert Roach "favorable."

Personally, Novarro hated the film and his performance. In an interview in the April 1931 issue of Modern Screen, he said "In acting, in directing, in everything — I want to be 'definite'. Even when I am later proven wrong — it will at least have been so definite that I myself know it. I am responsible for the worst performance that has ever been given on the screen. It was in A Certain Young Man and it was terrible. I am mortally ashamed of it — yet I'd rather have been bad than just fair."

References

External links
 
 

1928 comedy films
1928 films
Films directed by Hobart Henley
Lost American films
Metro-Goldwyn-Mayer films
American silent feature films
Films based on British novels
American black-and-white films
Silent American comedy films
1928 lost films
Lost comedy films
1920s American films